John Edward King (1821 – December 6, 1881) was a justice of the Louisiana Supreme Court for one day, January 9, 1877.

King was a member of Louisiana Constitutional Convention of 1852, Speaker of the Louisiana House of Representatives in 1852, and a state district judge in Opelousas, Louisiana, in 1870. He was appointed to the state supreme court by Governor Stephen B. Packard to succeed Judge William Gillespie Wyly; the court was turned out of office by the Democrats on the same day that it convened. The seat was later filled by Governor Francis T. Nicholls, who appointed William B. Giles Egan.

King died in Opelousas.

References

Justices of the Louisiana Supreme Court
1821 births
1881 deaths
Speakers of the Louisiana House of Representatives